Särkisalo is a former municipality of Finland, located mostly on Särkisalo island. It was consolidated with Salo on January 1, 2009.

It is located in the province of Western Finland and is part of the Southwest Finland region. The municipality had a population of 710 (2004-12-31) and covered an area of 82.85 km² (excluding sea) of which 1.06 km² is inland water. The population density was 8.68 inhabitants per km².

The municipality was bilingual, with majority being Finnish and minority Swedish speakers.

External links

http://www.sarkisalo.fi/ – Official website 

Former municipalities of Finland
Finnish islands in the Baltic
Salo, Finland
Populated places disestablished in 2009
2009 disestablishments in Finland